Le Silence de la cité is a French language science-fiction novel by Élisabeth Vonarburg. It was first published in Canada in 1981 and has been translated in English under the title The Silent City. It received the Prix Rosny-Aîné in 1982

1981 Canadian novels
Novels by Élisabeth Vonarburg
Feminist science fiction novels
Canadian science fiction novels
1981 science fiction novels
Canadian French-language novels